Emperor Daozong of Liao (14 September 1032 – 12 February 1101), personal name Chala, sinicised name Yelü Hongji, was the eighth emperor of the Khitan-led Liao dynasty of China.

Life

Emperor Daozong succeeded his father, Emperor Xingzong, in 1055. He was notable for reviving the official dynastic name "Great Liao" in 1066, a designation first given the empire by the Emperor Taizong in 947. Other noteworthy achievements made during his reign include the completion of a Liao edition of the Buddhist Tripitaka and the construction of the Sakyamuni Pagoda in 1056.

Emperor Daozong faced a number of assassination attempts throughout his life. In 1063, a group of Khitans, angry that their system of tribal justice had been put under local administration by ethnic Han, ambushed the emperor while he was on a hunting trip. Emperor Daozong survived the attack and the rebels were executed. However, in order to reassert his legitimacy as emperor, he was forced to perform a traditional "rebirth" ceremony. In 1070, he restructured the Liao legal system to reflect the differences in Han and Khitan customs.

Emperor Daozong's wife, Xiao Guanyin, was said to have been a virtuous woman who would persuade him to be a good leader and to purge corrupt officials. However, Daozong was not interested in ruling the empire and did not take her advice seriously. Xiao Guanyin would stay in her chambers and write poetry to pass the time. A corrupt official by the name of Yelü Yixin (耶律乙辛) feared the influence she had on the emperor and plotted to have her removed. Yelü Yixin conspired with a palace maiden into tricking the empress into writing a love poem. When Xiao Guanyin had finished writing the poem, Yelü Yixin presented the poem to Emperor Daozong, and insisted that the poem contained hidden messages that the empress was having an affair with another man. Emperor Daozong believed Yelü Yixin, and executed the empress in 1075. Yelü Yixin then went on to execute the crown prince and any other officials he did not like. Eventually, Emperor Daozong caught on, and began to take away Yelü Yixin's privileges one by one. Yelü Yixin then attempted to defect to Song, but was caught in the process; he was finally executed in 1083 AD, but the damage he had done to the empire was already done.

Emperor Daozong's reign was fraught with corruption. He spent lavishly on his palaces and his Buddhist worship. Many people under his rule were angered by the high taxes and began to rebel against the Liao dynasty, most notably the Jurchen tribes which would eventually establish the Jin dynasty and overthrow the Liao dynasty.

Family
Consort and issue(s):
 Empress Xuanyi, of the Xiao clan (宣懿皇后 蕭氏, 1040–13 December 1075), personal name Guanyin (觀音), first cousin once removed
 Yelü Jun, Crown Prince Zhaohuai (耶律濬 昭懷太子, 1058 – 1077), 1st son
 Princess of Wei (魏國公主), personal name Sagezhi (撒葛只), 1st daughter
Married Xiao Xiamo (蕭霞抹)
 Princess of Zhao (趙國公主, d. 1089), personal name Jiuli (糾里), 2nd daughter
Married Xiao Tabuye, Prince of Lanling (蘭陵郡王 蕭撻不也)
 Imperial Princess Liang of Song (梁宋國大長公主), personal name Teli (特里), 3rd daughter
Married Xiao Chouwu (蕭酬斡)
Married Xiao Temo (蕭特末) and had issue (two sons)
 Grand Consort Dowager Feng, of the Xiao clan (太皇太妃 蕭氏, d. 1181), personal name Tansi (坦思) – No issue.
 Lady, of the Xiao clan (蕭氏), personal name Wotelan (斡特懶) – No issue.

Notes 

1032 births
1101 deaths
Liao dynasty emperors
Liao dynasty Buddhists
Chinese Buddhist monarchs
11th-century Chinese monarchs
12th-century Chinese monarchs
People from Chifeng
11th-century Khitan rulers
12th-century Khitan rulers